Tania Balachova (Russian: Таня Балашова, diminutive of Татьяна Павловна Балашова [Tatiana Pavlovna Balachova]) (1902-1973) was a French actress and director of Russian origin. After World War II, she would become one of the most influential actor training teachers in France.

Early life 
Balachova was born in Saint Petersburg on February 25, 1902. Her family emigrated to Brussels, where she studied at the Royal Conservatory.  It was at the conservatory that she met her future husband, the Belgian actor Raymond Rouleau.

Career 
Balachova and Rouleau married and moved together to Paris. There, they collaborated with Gaston Baty, Charles Dullin, Louis Jouvet, Georges Pitoëff and Antonin Artaud, among others. They separated in 1940, though they continued to work together professionally. 

She originated the role of Inès in Jean-Paul Sartre's Huis Clos [No Exit] at the Vieux-Colombier Theatre in May 1944.:30 She went on to become one of the most influential actor-training teachers in France, training many of the next generation of theatre and cinema talent in France.

Death 
She died in Bagnoles-de-l'Orne France, on 4 August 1973 of a heart attack.

Notable students 
 Niels Arestrup 
Danièle Delorme:155

Maurice Garrel

Michael Lonsdale

Christian Marquand

Antoine Vitez:416

Selected theatre works

References 

1902 births
French stage actresses
20th-century French actresses
French people of Russian descent
Actresses from Saint Petersburg
1973 deaths